The WKRQ Tower is a free-standing lattice tower with triangular cross section used by WKRQ and WKRC-TV as well as several other radio stations located in Cincinnati, Ohio. The tower was built in the early 1960s a period when numerous tall free standing steel lattice towers were being built across the United States including the WCPO TV Tower, the Turner Broadcasting Tower, the WHDH-TV Tower and the WITI TV Tower.
 
The WKRQ Tower remains the tallest freestanding structure in Cincinnati to this day and one of four  that rise above 900 feet in the city.

Stations

Radio
FM stations that transmit from the WKRQ Tower include the following:

Television
TV stations that transmit from WKRQ Tower include the following:

See also 
 Lattice tower
 List of tallest freestanding steel structures

References

Lattice towers
Towers completed in the 1960s
Radio masts and towers in Ohio
Buildings and structures in Cincinnati